Balwant Baswant Wankhade is an Indian politician from Maharashtra and a Member of the Indian National Congress. He was elected in the 2019 election as a member of the Legislative Assembly of Maharashtra from Daryapur Vidhan Sabha constituency.

References

Living people
Indian National Congress politicians
Maharashtra MLAs 2019–2024
Year of birth missing (living people)